Josh Capon (born 1972) is an American chef and television personality.

Early life
Josh Capon attended the University of Maryland where he discovered his talent in cooking for his friends, which he funded by accepting small donations. Subsequently, this led to Capon transferring to Johnson and Wales University, the only culinary school offering a bachelor's degree at the time, as it became clear that his interests were cooking, rather than choosing a major. He graduated in 1994.

Career
After finishing his education, Capon accepted an offer from Charlie Palmer to help open The Lenox Room.

He subsequently went on to work for David Burke at the Park Avenue Café, and was offered an exchange opportunity to work in Europe, where he studied cooking in seven different restaurants in France, Italy, Germany, and Spain.

Capon returned to Manhattan in 1997 and was hired as a sous-chef at The St. Regis Hotel's Astor Court. He then became the executive chef at Alva, owned by Palmer. He left the restaurant in 1999 to work for a more upscale restaurant, Matthew's, owned by Matthew Kenney. He was chosen by Kenney to work for his SoHo restaurant, Canteen, until it closed in 2004.

Capon then became the executive chef at New York City's Lure Fishbar, where he still works.

In April 2010, Capon competed in The Early Show Saturday Edition'''s "Chef on a Shoestring" challenge, and prepared a three-course fish dinner for four on a $40 budget and spent only $39.11 for the dinner.

Capon has been a guest judge on the Food Network competitive shows Chopped and Beat Bobby Flay he also made an appearance at the New York City Wine and Food Festival in October 2010 along with several other celebrity chefs. He served the People's Choice Awards at last year's Food and Wine Festival's Burger Bash, hosted by Rachael Ray.

He is the chef and partner of Burger & Barrel.

Capon is a recurring cast member on the Paramount Network reality television series Bar Rescue''.

In 2021 he was cofounder of TLC group with Jared Goldstrom

See also
Chopped (TV series)
Matthew Kenney

References

American chefs
American male chefs
Living people
1973 births